Midland Red was a bus company that operated in The Midlands from 1905 until 1981. It was one of the largest English bus companies, operating over a large area between Gloucester in the south and Derbyshire in the north, and from Northampton to the Welsh border. The company also manufactured buses.

History

Origins 
In 1899 the British Electric Traction (BET) company acquired the assets of the Birmingham General Omnibus Company, which had been formed three years earlier to acquire a number of horse bus operations in Birmingham. When BET ordered new buses for Birmingham the next year, they were painted red to make them stand out. In 1902 BET acquired the City of Birmingham Tramways Company, which operated horse buses as well as trams.

The Birmingham & Midland Motor Omnibus Company  (BMMO) was formed by local businessmen in November 1904 to operate motor bus services in Birmingham. When the directors failed to attract sufficient investors, BET acquired control of the new company, and in 1905 transferred its local horse bus operations to it. The company also acquired a motor bus company which had started in 1903. BMMO started operations under its own name in July 1905. However, the company experienced problems with its motor buses, and in 1907 reverted all its motor bus services to horse bus operation.

In 1912 the company purchased some Tilling-Stevens petrol-electric buses. Further motor buses followed, and by June 1913 only 17 horse buses remained. The company adopted for its motor buses the red livery used by Birmingham General, and the buses carried the fleetname "Midland". They soon acquired the nickname Midland Red.

Expansion outside Birmingham
By 1912 the Birmingham Corporation Tramways had used its statutory powers to acquire the city's tramways which it did not already own, and wanted to consolidate the operation of bus and tram operations in the city. Since it was going to be difficult for BMMO to expand in the city, it reached agreement with the corporation to operate services from outside Birmingham into the city and transfer its services within the city to the corporation. The company then expanded outside Birmingham, and moved its headquarters to Bearwood in Smethwick.

During World War I, the company took over BET operations in Worcester and elsewhere, and after the war opened depots in Walsall, Coventry, Wolverhampton, Hereford, Stafford, Banbury, Bromsgrove, Shrewsbury, Nuneaton, Leamington Spa and Leicester. During the 1920s the tramways owned by BET in the Black Country were gradually replaced by Midland Red buses.

In 1930, the Great Western Railway and the London Midland & Scottish Railway together acquired 50% of the company. The few GWR bus services in the area were transferred to Midland Red.

Coach services
Midland Red started express coach services in 1921 with routes to Weston-super-Mare and Llandudno. Coach services expanded, and in 1934 Midland Red became a founder member of the Associated Motorways consortium.

Coach services were heavily reduced during World War II, but expanded again after the war. When the M1 motorway opened in 1959, Midland Red started non-stop express services between Birmingham and London, and later between Coventry and London. For the service, the company developed Britain's first high-speed motor-coach. The opening of the M5 motorway enabled the operation of express services between Birmingham and Worcester.

Nationalisation 
When the railways were nationalised forming in 1947 under the Transport Act 1947, Midland Red became 50% state-owned. In 1968, BET sold its UK bus interests to the government, and on 1 January 1969 the company became the largest subsidiary of the National Bus Company (NBC). The livery was later changed from a deep red to the NBC corporate poppy red.

In 1973 the garages (with the exception of Digbeth Coach Station, Bearwood and Cradley Heath) and routes within the West Midlands county were transferred to the control of the West Midlands Passenger Transport Authority, leaving Midland Red with country and local routes mainly in Derbyshire, Herefordshire, Leicestershire, Nottinghamshire, Shropshire, Staffordshire, Warwickshire and Worcestershire and express services.

Rebranding
From 1977 onwards, after extensive passenger research the company was rebranded into local area names under the Viable Network Project, something that was soon renamed as the Market Analysis Project and widely adopted throughout NBC and elsewhere in the bus industry. Each new network spawned a localised brand, as follows:

Breakup

On 6 September 1981, Midland Red was split into six new companies:
Midland Red East, renamed Midland Fox in January 1984: Leicestershire, south Derbyshire and east Staffordshire (the Lancer and Leicester operations)
Midland Red North: Shropshire, south Staffordshire, and northern West Midlands (the Chaserider, Hotspur, Mercian and Tellus operations)
Midland Red South: Warwickshire and north Oxfordshire (the Avonbus, Hunter, Leamington & Warwick, Ridercross and Rugby operations)
Midland Red West Herefordshire, Worcestershire, south and east quadrants of West Midlands (the Reddibus, Severnlink, Wanderward, Wayfarer and Wendaway operations)
Midland Red Express, later renamed Midland Red Coaches: central coach and express services division, became part of Midland Red West in 1984
Midland Red Engineering, later renamed Carlyle Works: central engineering workshops at Carlyle Road, Edgbaston

Privatisation
As part of the privatisation of the National Bus Company, the companies were sold:
Midland Fox, formerly Midland Red East, was sold on 18 August 1987 in a management buyout. The operations of the Swadlincote depot were purchased by Stevensons of Uttoxeter. Today all have been reunited as part of Arriva Fox County. It is a division of Arriva Midlands. 
Midland Red North was sold on 27 January 1988 to the Drawlane Transport Group. It was included in the sale of Drawlane to British Bus which in turn became part of the Cowie Group. Today it is part of Arriva Midlands.
Midland Red South was sold on 10 December 1987 to Western Travel Limited who also owned the Cheltenham & Gloucester Omnibus Company. Today it is part of Stagecoach in Oxfordshire and Stagecoach in Warwickshire. Midland Red (South) Ltd. is the legal name for Stagecoach in Warwickshire. 
Midland Red West was sold on 22 December 1986 in a management buyout led by managing director Ken Mills to Midland West Holdings It who also took over Midland Red Coaches on the same date. Today it is part of First Midland Red but only has one surviving depot in Worcester.  The Kidderminster and Redditch operations were sold to Rotala while the company withdrew from operating in Hereford.
Carlyle Works, formerly Midland Red Engineering, was sold to Frontsource Limited, who also purchased the engineering divisions of an initial eight and later nine National Bus Companies. It closed in October 1991.

Bus manufacture
In 1912 the company bought its first Tilling-Stevens petrol-electric vehicles. Tilling-Stevens became the main supplier of bus chassis to the company which, under its Chief Engineer LG Wyndham Shire, adapted and developed the designs to its own requirements, finally designing a vehicle it intended to construct itself.

Between 1923 and 1969, the BMMO built most of the buses it operated: up to 1940 these were called SOS (rumoured to stand for Superior Omnibus Specification), and some models were supplied to other bus companies associated within the British Electric Traction (BET) group, namely Trent, PMT and Northern General. After 1940, the vehicles were identified by the company's initials, BMMO, and supplied solely for the BMMO company's own use. Codes later used for buses were FEDD (Front Entrance Double Decker), REDD (Rear Entrance Double Decker), Coaches were initially classified "ONC", but later used a prefix of "C" – or "CM" for Motorway coaches.

Single Decker models after the war were numbered S6, then S8 through S23, Double Decker models D1 through D10. The D10 was, in some opinions, the pinnacle of BMMO bus design – a double decker with front entrance/rear exit and an underfloor engine, but only two were produced. AD2, GD6 and LD8 were exceptions to the normal designation system – these codes referred to batches of respectively AEC, Guy and Leyland vehicles acquired when the manufacturing operation could not meet the heavy demand. Individual buses were numbered from (around) 2000 to 5900 – registrations (usually) incorporated the last three numbers of the serial, and a letter prefix of three letters ending in "HA" ( a Smethwick origin registration mark). This relationship did not apply to the limited number of buses gained as a result of acquisition of other operators.

Bus manufacture, overhaul and accident repair was carried out at Carlyle Works, adjacent to the Rotton Park Reservoir in Edgbaston, Birmingham. Nearby to the works was BMMO's head office, in Vernon Road, Edgbaston.

Historical list of Midland Red garages
Other short time-span garages (either owned or rented) included: Birmingham, Ladywood Road (Five Ways Inn yard); Coventry, Sandy Lane; Cradley, (GWR station yard); Halesowen, Mucklow Hill (GWR station yard); Hereford, Bridge Street (Black Lion Yard); Kingswinford, The Portway; Leicester, Frog Island; Leicester, Hastings Road; Leicester, Welford Road; Nuneaton, Burgage Walk (ex NWMO&T Co); Nuneaton, Heath End Road; Nuneaton, the former Empire theatre; Sedgley, WDET Co depot; Shrewsbury, Abbey foregate (ex Allen Omnibus Co); Shrewsbury, Roushill; Stafford, Co-operative Street; Wellington, Mansell Street.

Timeline
1904: Formation of BMMO.
1905: First services.
1914–1920: Rapid spread of services outside Birmingham to 'Paint the Midlands Red'.
1920s: Development of long-distance coach routes using charabancs.
1923: First production run of BMMO buses, SOS 'S' type – one of the first British buses to have pneumatic tyres.
1927: 'QL' type bus produced, the first Midland Red bus design to have brakes on all wheels.
1930s: Development of petrol and diesel engines. Experimental rear-engined buses built.
1940s: Experiments with, and production of under-floor engined single-deck buses.
1950s: Experiments and developments of integral construction, independent front suspension, air suspension, rubber suspension, glass fibre construction and disc brakes.
1958: Introduction of the D9, a new half-cab double deck design incorporating most of the successful features developed in the 1950s.
1959: The introduction of the CM5T, a turbocharged coach capable of almost 100 mph, for non-stop motorway services. The Birmingham-London express coach service launched on 2 November – the same day that the M1 motorway was opened. CM5T designation indicated by 'M' high speed (Motorway) capability and by 'T' fitted with passenger toilet facilities.
1960: Appearance of the first of the two experimental D10 double-deckers, with under-floor engines.
1963: One of the country's first fully enclosed city centre bus stations was opened at Birmingham's Bull Ring Shopping Centrre, from which most Midland Red services in the City Centre departed.
1960s: Larger motorway coach introduced, the CM6T between 1963–6. Midland Red becomes the first British bus company to make wide-scale use of computers in compiling bus schedules and staff rosters.
1970s: Winding down of vehicle production. Last Midland Red built-bus (S23 single-decker no. 5991) produced in 1970. Split up of the operating area – West Midlands PTE take the West Midlands Metropolitan area garages.
1980s: Midland Red forcibly split into five operating companies and an engineering company. Leading to privatisation by buy-outs and substantial reduction in services.
1990s: Take over by the current conglomerate transport groups.

See also
The Transport Museum, Wythall

References

Further reading
Anderson, R.C. A History of The Midland Red. Newton Abbot: David and Charles (1984).
Gray, P. Midland Red (Vol.1) – A history of the company and its vehicles up to 1940. Glossop: Transport Publishing Company (1978).
Gray, P. Midland Red (Vol.2) – A history of the company and its vehicles from 1940–1970. Glossop: Transport Publishing Company (1979).
Greenwood, M. The Heyday of Midland Red. Hersham: Ian Allan (2005).
Keeley, M. Midland Red. London: Ian Allan (1983).
Keeley, M. Midland Red – Working Days. Hersham: Ian Allan, in conjunction with the Transport Museum, Wythall (2008).
Richards, S. More Room on Top – Midland Red: The BMMO D9 and D10. Steve Richards (2012). 
Torode, R. and Keeley, M. Midland Red Style. London: Capital Transport (2011).

External links

Flickr gallery
MidlandRed.net
Large collection of preserved Midland Red buses and coaches Transport Museum, Wythall
Black Country Living Museum - owner of preserved BMMO D9 bus, fleet number 5342

Companies based in Smethwick
Defunct bus manufacturers of the United Kingdom
Former nationalised industries of the United Kingdom
1905 establishments in England
1981 disestablishments in England
Former bus operators in the West Midlands (county)
Former bus operators in Herefordshire
Former bus operators in Staffordshire
Former bus operators in Oxfordshire
Former bus operators in Worcestershire
Former bus operators in Shropshire
Former bus operators in Leicestershire
Former bus operators in Nottinghamshire